Julio Algar Pérez-Castilla (born 16 October 1969) is a Spanish retired footballer who played as a right back, and is a manager.

Managerial statistics

References

External links

1969 births
Living people
Footballers from Madrid
Spanish footballers
Association football defenders
Segunda División players
Segunda División B players
Tercera División players
Real Madrid Castilla footballers
Villarreal CF players
Córdoba CF players
Real Murcia players
FC Cartagena footballers
UE Figueres footballers
Spanish football managers
Lorca Deportiva CF managers
Lorca FC managers
Real Murcia managers